Admiral Norwich Duff FRSE (15 August 1792 – 21 April 1862) was a Royal Navy officer.

Life
The son of Captain George Duff RN, and Sophia Dirom, he was born at 9 South Castle Street, Edinburgh. He entered the Royal Navy in July 1805, just before his 13th birthday, serving aboard his father's ship  as a midshipman. In October 1805 at the Battle of Trafalgar his father was killed.

Duff was promoted to lieutenant in September 1811 and was appointed flag-lieutenant to the commander-in-chief in February 1814. He was promoted to commander on 15 June 1814 and appointed to command of the 18-gun brig-sloop , part of the naval force in the Chesapeake during the War of 1812, and later took part in the attack on New Orleans.

In October 1816 Duff was appointed to command of the 10-gun brig-sloop  and sent to the Caribbean, where he assumed command of the 18-gun  in September 1817. He returned to England in August 1818.

He undertook an extensive continental European tour in 1819 of which he kept a journal. He was promoted to Post captain on 23 April 1822.

In 1823 he was elected a Fellow of the Royal Society of Edinburgh his proposer being Alexander Dirom.

On the 10 June 1833 he married Helen Mary Shoolbred (daughter of East India Company Surgeon John Shoolbred 1766–1831) at Bath, Somerset and with her produced eight recorded children.   
The couple's eldest daughter, (Helen) Sophia Duff 18341930, married Boscawen Trevor Griffith (whose name later changed to Griffith-Boscawen) as a result of which Norwich became the maternal grandfather of Arthur Sackville Trevor Griffith-Boscawen 18651946, a prominent British Conservative politician during the early decades of the twentieth century. 
Another daughter, Henrietta, was a novelist.

Duff was promoted to rear admiral on 8 October 1852, and to vice admiral on 28 November 1857.

He died at Bath, Somerset, England on 21 April 1862. There is a portrait of him by Sir Henry Raeburn, and a metal plaque commemorates him in Bath Abbey.

Family
In 1833 he married Helen Mary Shoolbred (1811-1895), daughter of Dr John Shoolbred FRSE of the East India Company.

See also

References

External links 

  archived Web site at Wayback Machine.
 
 

1792 births
1862 deaths
Military personnel from Edinburgh
Royal Navy admirals
Royal Navy personnel of the War of 1812
Royal Navy personnel of the Napoleonic Wars
Fellows of the Royal Society of Edinburgh